Events from the year 1654 in France

Incumbents
 Monarch – Louis XIV

Events
25 August – Battle of Arras

Births

Full date missing
Louis de Boullogne, painter (died 1733)
Jean-François Gerbillon, missionary (died 1707)
Pierre Varignon, mathematician (died 1722)

Deaths

Full date missing
Germain Habert, clergyman and poet (born 1615)
Jean-Louis Guez de Balzac, essayist (born 1597)
Nicolas Rigault, classical scholar (born 1577)
Claude de Razilly, naval officer (born 1593))

See also

References

1650s in France